Ann J. Simonton (born 1952) is an American writer, lecturer, media activist, and former fashion model. She founded and coordinates the non-profit group "Media Watch", which challenges what they see as racism, sexism, and violence in the media through education and action. Simonton has published two autobiographical chapters, I Never Told Anyone and Her Wits About Her. She has also written and produced two educational videos, one of which, Don't Be a TV: Television Victim, received a Silver Apple Award from the National Educational Video and Film Festival in 1995.

Biography
Simonton began as a fashion model in Los Angeles and vaulted to the top of the modelling world in New York City in the early 1970s. On June 24, 1971, she was gang raped at knifepoint in Morningside Park on her way to a modeling assignment. This event informed her activism to help end sexual assaults on women.

Simonton became a radical feminist activist, and has been arrested and jailed 11 times for committing acts of non-violent civil disobedience. In the 1980s, she and Nikki Craft  led the "Myth California" protests, a series of counter-pageants which accused the Miss California pageant of contributing to "the objectification of women and the glorification of the beauty myth." Simonton wore various meat outfits in these protests: one of baloney in 1982, skirt steak in 1985, and turkey slices in 1987. In 1987 she shaved off all her bleached blond hair in front of the pageant venue in San Diego to protest "racist attitudes" in the pageants. The protests garnered international attention, and were partially responsible for the Miss California pageant relocating from Santa Cruz to San Diego, California.

Simonton lectures nationally on university campuses with a presentation entitled, "Sex, Power and the Media." She has been a guest on Dr. Phil, The Oprah Winfrey Show, Larry King Live, Entertainment Tonight and CNN's Crossfire.

Simonton worked as a Ford fashion model in the 1970s.

Selected publications

Chapters in books

References

External links
Media Watch
Media Watch channel at YouTube
Radio Interviews by Ann Simonton
Slow Sex: Moving Toward Informed Pleasure by Ann Simonton, CommonDreams.org, February 9, 2008.
Sports Illustrated cover, January 28, 1974.
"The Woman Warrior" by Jill Lieber, Sports Illustrated, February 7, 1989.
"Radical Body Politics for Women" by Kirsten Anderberg, 2003.
"Getting results with low-budget media activism" by Michael Stoll, Grade the News, January 21, 2004.

Living people
American feminist writers
American women's rights activists
Anti-pornography feminists
Radical feminists
1952 births
Female models from California
Models from Los Angeles

Activists from California
21st-century American women